Events in the year 1997 in Norway.

Incumbents
 Monarch – Harald V
 Prime Minister – Thorbjørn Jagland (Labour Party) until October 17, Kjell Magne Bondevik (Christian Democratic Party)

Events

 18 January – The Norwegian explorer Børge Ousland became the first to complete an unassisted Antarctic solo crossing.
 4 June –  Great Nordic Biker War: a car bomb destroyed the Bandidos motorcycle gang's Norwegian chapter headquarters in Drammen, killing Irene Astrid Bekkevold, who was passing by in her car when the bomb went off. The explosion caused widespread material damage in the area, including to the Drammens Is ice cream factory. The bombing had been planned by the Norwegian chapter of the rival Hells Angels motorcycle gang, seven members of which were eventually convicted and sentenced to prison terms from 5 to 16 years.
 15 September – The 1997 Parliamentary election takes place. While Labour won a plurality of seats, they were unable to reach Jagland's 36,9% threshold, gaining 35% of the vote. As a result of this, the Labour government stepped down, being replaced by a centrist coalition of the Christian People's Party,  Liberal Party and the Centre Party, with Kjell Magne Bondevik being appointed Prime Minister.
 17 October – Bondevik's First Cabinet was appointed.
 22 December –  Værøy is struck by a 3.3 magnitude earthquake.

Popular culture

Sports
29 June to 12 July – the UEFA Women's Euro 1997 was held in several cities.
11 to 16 August – the 1997 World Orienteering Championships were held in Grimstad.

Music

Film

Literature

Novels
Jo Nesbø – Flaggermusmannen

Television

Anniversaries
 1000 years since Trondheim was founded by Olav Tryggvason

Notable births
 

9 January – Jacob Karlstrom, footballer
17 January – Andreas Hanche-Olsen, footballer
28 January – Mons Røisland, snowboarder
30 January – Mathias Bringaker, footballer
31 January – Helene Gigstad Fauske, handball player
3 February – Thomas Bucher-Johannessen, cross-country skier
4 February – Henrik Bjørdal, footballer
7 February – Per Magnus Steiring, footballer
8 February – Audun Heimdal, orienteering and ski orienteering competitor (d. 2022).
15 February – Marie Dølvik Markussen, footballer
1 March – Johannes Johannesen, ice hockey player
3 March – Iman Meskini, actress
6 March – Alisha Boe, actress
7 March – Thomas Hayes, actor
19 March – Viktor Durasovic, tennis player
17 April – Martin Samuelsen, footballer
6 May – Simen Brekkhus, footballer
7 May – Johan Salomon, chess player
10 May – Julian Kristoffersen, footballer
12 May – Amund Wichne, footballer
24 May – Magnus Fredriksen, handball player.
25 May – Tobias Foss, cyclist
11 June – Julian Veen Uldal, footballer
18 June – Morten Sætra, footballer
30 June – Mathias Gjerstrøm, footballer
2 July – Anders Mol, beach volleyball player
7 July – Magnus Abelvik Rød, handball player
15 July – Markus André Kaasa, footballer
17 July – Sigurd Hauso Haugen, footballer
17 July – Magnus Ramsfjell, curler
24 July – Jostein Ekeland, footballer
28 July – Sivert Solli, footballer
2 August – Håkon Lorentzen, footballer
3 August – Adrian Lillebekk Ovlien, footballer (d. 2018).
4 August – Tuva Hansen, footballer
6 August – Sander Svendsen, footballer
24 August (in Britain) – Alan Walker, music producer
27 August – Eirik Haugan, footballer
30 August Tobias Lauritsen, footballer
3 September – Sulayman Bojang, footballer
11 September – Erlend Dahl Reitan, footballer
18 September – Viktor Hovland, golf player
6 October – Lene Cecilia Sparrok, actress
15 October – Jarl Magnus Riiber, Nordic combined skier
28 October – Edvard Linnebo Race, footballer
28 October – Marcus Mehnert, footballer
17 November – Julian Ryerson, footballer
24 November – Patrick Berg, footballer
25 November – Mathias Rasmussen, footballer
14 December – Beatrice Nedberge Llano,  athlete specialising in the hammer throw
31 December – Kjerstin Boge Solås, handball player

Notable deaths
 

3 January – Jon Lennart Mjøen, actor, film director and screenwriter (b. 1912)
3 January – Erling Mossige, jurist and banker (1907)
4 January – Tormod Skagestad, poet, novelist, playwright, actor and theatre director (b. 1920)
14 January – Ebba Lodden, politician (b.1911)
14 January – Henny Mürer, choreographer and dancer (b. 1925)
18 January – Henry Hermansen, cross-country skier (b. 1921)
25 January – Lars Brandstrup, gallerist (b. 1913)
25 January – Gunnar Nygaard, broadcasting pioneer (born 1897).
27 January – Berte Rognerud, politician (b.1907)
3 February – Richard Andvord, businessman and resistance member (b. 1920)
9 February – Thorleif Dahl, jurist and civil servant (b. 1907)
10 February – Harriet Andreassen, labour activist, politician and Minister (b.1925)
10 February – Olaf Strand, middle-distance runner (b. 1899)
15 February – Frode Rinnan, architect and politician (b. 1905)
17 February – Lorentz Nitter, physician (b.1910).
3 March – Erik Waaler, professor of medicine (b. 1903)
9 March – Ingvard Sverdrup, politician (b.1936)
15 March – Kåre Holt, author (b.1916)
16 March – Paal Frisvold, general (b. 1908)
17 March – Harald Gustav Nilsen, illustrator (b. 1909).
19 March – Johannes Bråten, politician (b.1920)
21 March – Liv Andersen, politician (b.1919)
21 March – Elna Kimmestad, actress (b. 1918)
27 March – Birger Hatlebakk, industrialist and politician (b.1912)
28 March – Arthur Arntzen, politician (b.1906)
3 April – John Ugelstad, chemical engineer and inventor (b. 1921)
12 April – Gunnar Ellefsen, politician (b.1930)
13 April – Bjørn Bue, Lutheran missionary and bishop (b. 1934)
17 April – Folke Hauger Johannessen, admiral of the Royal Norwegian Navy (b. 1913)
26 April – Eigil Helland-Hansen, travel agent (b. 1910)
5 May – Leif Longum, essayist and literary scholar (b. 1927)
8 May – Clara Ottesen, economist, politician and feminist (b. 1911)
22 May – Nina Eik-Nes, politician (b.1900)
31 May – Sven Hauge, military officer (b. 1923)
5 June – Thor With, bishop (b. 1918)
6 June – Thorleif Kristensen, politician (b.1916)
13 June – Johan Richter, engineer, industrialist and inventor (b. 1901)
22 June – Lars Bergendahl, cross country skier and triple World Champion (b.1909)
23 June – Jenny Søyseth, politician (b. 1922)
1 July – Torvald Kvinlaug, politician (b. 1911)
16 July – Johan A. Vikan, politician (b.1912)
20 July – Alf Engen, skier and skiing school owner/teacher in America (b.1909)
26 July – Gunnvor Advocaat, painter (b. 1912)
2 August – Harald Kihle, painter and illustrator (b.1905).
16 August – Alf Malland, actor (b. 1917)
24 August – Randi Monsen, illustrator (b. 1910).
30 August – Søren H. H. Larsen, physicist (b. 1920)
1 September – Reidar Olsen, footballer (b. 1910)
10 September – Einar Jørum, footballer (b. 1924)
12 September – Haaken Severin Mathiesen, landowner (b. 1926)
14 September – Ernst Fredrik Eckhoff, judge (b.1905)
16 September – Liv Stubberud, politician (b.1930)
17 September – Jan P. Syse, lawyer and politician (b. 1930)
6 October – Gunnar Odd Hagen, politician (b. 1921)
14 October – John Qvale, police chief and judge (b. 1911)
20 October – Thormod Næs, sport shooter (b. 1930)
4 November – Erik Poppe, professor of medicine, specialist in oncology (b. 1905)
6 November – Anne Stine Ingstad, archaeologist (b.1918)
11 November – Shake Keane, jazz musician and poet (b. 1927)
16 November – Wilhelm Hayden, competition rower (b. 1926)
18 November – Fredrik Horn, footballer (b. 1916)
19 November – Kjell Schou-Andreassen, footballer (b. 1940)
20 November – Asbjørn Aavik, missionary (b. 1902)
22 November – Willy Evensen, rower (b. 1919)
23 November – Oddvar Vargset, wrestler (b. 1925)
23 November – Karl Valdemar Westerlund, politician (b.1907)
30 November – Alfred Næss, playwright and songwriter (b. 1927)
1 December – Eldrid Erdal, politician (b.1901)
5 December – Jan Voigt, actor, dancer and museum director (b. 1928)
15 December – Karsten Andersen, conductor (b. 1920)
18 December – Harriet Holter, social psychologist (b. 1922)
19 December – Alf Nordhus, barrister (b. 1919)
28 December – Roald Dysthe, businessperson (b. 1903)

Full date missing
Trygve Bjørgo, educator and poet (b.1916)
Per Brunsvig, barrister (b. 1917)
Gotfred Kvifte, physicist (b.1914)
Åse Hiorth Lervik, literary researcher (b.1933)
Bjarne Slapgard, educator and author (b.1901)
Jakob Sverdrup, historian (b.1919)
Alf Tveten, sailor and Olympic silver medallist (b.1912)

See also

References

External links

 
Norway